The Chapel of the Ascension ( Qapelat ha-ʿAliyya; , Ekklisáki tis Analípseos) is a chapel and shrine located on the Mount of Olives, in the At-Tur district of Jerusalem. Part of a larger complex consisting first of a Christian church and monastery, then an Islamic mosque, it is located on a site traditionally believed to be the earthly spot where Jesus ascended into Heaven after his Resurrection. It houses a slab of stone believed to contain one of his footprints.

Origin 
Almost 300 years after the ascension of Jesus, early Christians began gathering secretly in a small cave monastery on the Mount of Olives. The issuance of the Edict of Milan by the Roman Emperor Constantine I in 313 made it possible for Christians to worship without government persecution. By the time of the pilgrim Egeria's travels to Jerusalem in 384, the spot of veneration had been moved to the present location, uphill from the cave, which had been integrated into the Constantinian Church of Eleona. The first church was erected there a few years later, before 392, by a lady from the imperial family, Poimenia. A church is later attributed to Saint Helena and holds that during Saint Helena's pilgrimage to the Holy Land between 326 and 328, she identified two spots on the Mount of Olives as being associated with Jesus' life - the place of his Ascension, and a grotto associated with his teaching of the Lord's Prayer - and on her return to Rome, she ordered the construction of two sanctuaries at these locations.

4th-century church 
The first complex constructed on the site of the present chapel was known as Imbomon (Greek for "on the hill"). It was a rotunda, open to the sky, surrounded by circular porticoes and arches. Sometime between AD 384–390, Poimenia, a wealthy and pious Roman aristocratic woman of the imperial family, financed the building of the Byzantine-style church "around Christ's last footprints."

The Imbomon, as well as the nearby Eleona Basilica and other monasteries and churches on the Mount of Olives, were destroyed by the armies of the Persian Shah Khosrow II during the final phase of the Byzantine-Sassanid Wars in 614.

7th-century church 
The church was rebuilt in the late 7th century. The Frankish bishop and pilgrim Arculf, in relating his pilgrimage to Jerusalem in about the year 680, described this church as "a round building open to the sky, with three porticoes entered from the south. Eight lamps shone brightly at night through windows facing Jerusalem. Inside was a central edicule containing the footprints of Christ, plainly and clearly impressed in the dust, inside a railing."

12th-century church 
The reconstructed church was eventually destroyed, and rebuilt a second time by the Crusaders in the 12th century. The armies of Saladin later decimated the church, leaving only a partially intact outer 12x12 meter octagonal wall surrounding an inner 3x3 octagonal meter shrine, called a martyrium or edicule. This structure still stands today, although partially altered in the time after Saladin's 1187 conquest of Jerusalem.

Description of the chapel

Edicule (chapel) 
The main structure of the chapel is from the Crusader era; the stone dome and the octagonal drum it stands on are Muslim additions. The exterior walls are decorated with arches and marble columns. The entrance faces the west, and the south wall of the chapel consists of a mihrab indicating the direction of Mecca.

Ascension rock 
The edicule surrounds a stone slab called the "Ascension Rock". It is said to contain the right footprint of Christ, while the section bearing the left footprint was taken to the Al-Aqsa Mosque in the Middle Ages. The faithful believe that the impression was made as Jesus ascended into Heaven and is venerated as the last point on earth touched by the incarnate Christ.

Muslim history, tradition, and architecture

History 
After the fall of Jerusalem in 1187, the ruined church and monastery were abandoned by the Christians, who resettled in Acre. During this time, Saladin established the Mount of Olives as a waqf entrusted to two sheikhs, al-Salih Wali al-Din and Abu Hasan al-Hakari. This waqf was registered in a document dated 20 October 1188. The chapel was converted to a mosque, and a mihrab installed in it. Because the vast majority of pilgrims to the site were Christian, as a gesture of compromise and goodwill, Saladin ordered the construction of a second mosque nearby for Muslim worship while Christians continued to visit the main chapel.

Despite this act of accommodation by Saladin, tensions between Muslims and Christians in Jerusalem rose throughout the next 300 years. The shrine and surrounding structures saw periods of non-use and disrepair. By the 15th century, the destroyed eastern section was separated by a dividing wall and was no longer used for religious purposes. Currently, this building is under the authority of the Islamic Waqf of Jerusalem and is open to visitors of all faiths, for a nominal fee.

Tradition 
The mid-14th-century counter-crusade propaganda work Muthir al-gharam fi ziyarat al-Quds wa-sh-Sham ("Arousing love for visiting Jerusalem and Syria"; c. 1350-51) places the death year of Rabi'a al-'Adawiyya around 781/82 and has her buried in this burial crypt. Other historians, such as al-Harawi (d. 1215) and Yaqut (1179–1229) locate Rabi'a's grave in her hometown of Basra, and attribute the Mount of Olives tomb to another Rabi'a, wife of a Sufi, Ahmad Ibn Abu el Huari, from the late Crusader and early Ayyubid period. Yet another Muslim tradition attributes the grave to Rahiba bint Hasn, a woman of whom nothing is known.

Architecture 
The mosque that stands southwest to the former Church of the Ascension, known as the zawiya of Rabi'a al-'Adawiyya, consists of two edifices: the upper one, or the mosque proper; and an underground chamber at the lower end of a staircase, which includes a 2 m deep, 1.2 m wide, and 1.8 m high cell on its east side. Archaeologists Jon Seligman and Rafa Abu Raya, who carried out a short salvage excavation outside the southern wall of the mosque in 1995, have dated the underground chamber to the Byzantine period, identifying it as the burial crypt of a chapel that was part of the Church of the Ascension. The crypt is situated east of the mosque, and lies opposite of the entrance. To the right of the entrance, the cenotaph or sarcophagus stands within a niche.

Seligman and Abu Raya date the upper building to the medieval period, and hold an Ayyubid date to be the most likely. However, Denys Pringle suggests a Crusader date, based on features such as the western entrance which could indicate an east–west orientation of the structure, and the fact that the mihrab is set into an older window niche.

Christian and Jewish traditions

Christian tradition 
The Christian tradition of Saint Pelagia is the oldest. "The Life of Saint Pelagia the Harlot", the vita of a legendary 4th or 5th-century Christian hermit and penitent, Saint Pelagia of Antioch, states that she "built herself a cell on the Mount of Olives." There, she lived a holy life disguised as a monk and "wrought...many wonders." She died few years later due to her severe asceticism, "and the holy fathers bore her body to its burial."  Christian tradition places her cell and tomb at the site of the zawiya, adjacent to the southwest of the former Church of the Ascension.

However, most Western Christian pilgrims of the 14th century venerated the tomb as that of Saint Mary the Egyptian, although the Pelagia tradition also lives on.

Jewish tradition 
The Jewish tradition attributing the tomb to the prophetess Huldah is recorded from 1322 onwards, starting with Estori Ha-Parhi. Another tradition exists starting in the 2nd-century, Tosefta, which places the tomb of Huldah within Jerusalem's city walls.

Environs 
Across the street from the chapel is the Greek Orthodox Monastery of the Ascension and a residential building erected at the beginning of the 20th century, as well as a small church built between 1987 and 1992. 

The Russian Orthodox Convent of the Ascension, built in 1870, is located about 200 meters to the chapel's east. It now houses about 40 nuns.

To the chapel's north is Makassed Hospital, to its south is the Church of the Pater Noster, and to the northeast of the chapel is the Ascension Church (in the Augusta Victoria compound).

Gallery

References

Bibliography

External links

 Photos of the Chapel of the Ascension at the Manar al-Athar photo archive

12th-century churches
Mount of Olives
Ancient churches in the Holy Land
Relics associated with Jesus
Christian pilgrimages
Articles containing video clips
Chapels in Jerusalem
Status quo holy places
Religious buildings and structures converted into mosques
Churches in the State of Palestine
Ascension of Jesus